The Doncaster Mustangs are an American football based in Doncaster, South Yorkshire, England who compete in the BAFA National Leagues NFC 2 South, the third level of British American football. They play their games at Wheatley Hills Rugby Union club, having previously used the Keepmoat Stadium Athletics Field, the home of Doncaster Rovers. They were formed in the autumn of 2002 and during the 2008 season they were known as the South Yorkshire Mustangs. During their history, the club has also been based out of Retford, Nottinghamshire.

Team colours

Home Kit
Vegas Gold Helmet - Black Face cage,
Green Jersey, White numbers
Green Pants,
Black Socks.

Away Kit
Vegas Gold Helmet - Black Face cage,
White Jersey, Gold numbers
Green Pants,
Black Socks.

Season records

See also
British American Football League
BAFA National Leagues (formerly BAFA Community Leagues)
BritBowl

References

External links
Doncaster Mustangs official website

Sport in Doncaster
BAFA National League teams
American football teams in England
2002 establishments in England
American football teams established in 2002